Søren Sætter-Lassen (born 11 July 1955) is a Danish stage, film and television actor.

Filmography 
{{columns-list|colwidth=18em|
  (1980)
  (1982)
 Ved vejen (1988)
  (1991)
  (1992)
 Sort høst (1993)
 Snøvsen ta'r springet (1994)
  (1997)
  (1998)
 I Kina spiser de hunde (1999)
 Dybt vand (1999)
 Help! I'm a Fish (2000)
 Et rigtigt menneske (2001)
 Jolly Roger (2001)
 I Am Dina (2002)
  (2005)
  (2009)
 The Escape (2009)
 Klassefesten (2011)
 The Passion of Marie (2012)
 The Day Will Come (2016)
}}

 Awards 
 2000: Reumert award for best supporting actor, Don Carlos 2010: Reumert award for best actor, Richard III''

External links 
 

Danish male actors
1955 births
Living people
Danish male film actors
People from Horsens